State Route 256 (SR 256) is a primary state highway in the U.S. state of Virginia. Known for most of its length as Weyers Cave Road, the state highway runs  from U.S. Route 11 (US 11) near Weyers Cave east to US 340 in Grottoes. SR 256 connects Interstate 81 (I-81) with Weyers Cave in northern Augusta County and Grottoes, which is home to Grand Caverns, in southeastern Rockingham County.

Route description

SR 256 begins at an intersection with US 11 (Lee Highway) west of Weyers Cave. The state highway heads east as two-lane undivided Weyers Cave Road, which immediately has a diamond interchange with I-81. SR 256 has a grade crossing of the Chesapeake Western Railway and meets the southern end of SR 276 (Keezletown Road) in the community of Weyers Cave. The state highway passes Shenandoah Valley Regional Airport and crosses the Middle River, a tributary of the North River. SR 276 then crosses the South River—which with the North River forms the South Fork Shenandoah River—into Rockingham County and the town of Grottoes. The state highway passes along the southern edge of the town as 3rd Street and provides access to Grand Caverns, a National Natural Landmark that was originally known as Weyer's Cave and is the oldest show cave in the United States. SR 256 has a grade crossing of Norfolk Southern Railway's Roanoke District before reaching its eastern terminus at US 340 (East Side Highway).

Major intersections

References

External links

Virginia Highways Project: VA 256

256
State Route 256
State Route 256